The Red Car Trolley is a  tramway and transportation attraction at Disney California Adventure at the Disneyland Resort in Anaheim, California. Construction began on January 4, 2010, and the attraction opened on June 15, 2012, as part of the re-dedication of the park. The attraction features cars inspired by the Pacific Electric Railway's "Red Cars" that once traversed much of Southern California, and provides transportation between the park's main entry at Buena Vista Street and Sunset Boulevard near Guardians of the Galaxy – Mission: Breakout! in Hollywood Land (which became part of Avengers Campus).

Operation

Frequency 
Trolleys run approximately every 8 minutes while the park is open. Unlike the Main Street Vehicles that travel through neighboring Disneyland, the Red Car Trolley runs all day, only briefly pausing service when a parade travels down Hollywood Boulevard.

Vehicles 

The line has two trolley cars, built by Brookville Equipment, a manufacturer of diesel switcher locomotives and a rebuilder of classic trolley cars. The design of the Red Car Trolley rolling stock are inspired by the Pacific Electric "Hollywood" class cars, built in the 1920s.

 Car 623 is inspired by the 600-series trolleys built by the St. Louis Car Company in 1922, and wears a paint scheme similar to the one used when the "Hollywood" cars were first delivered. The “23” in the car's number is a reference to the year 1923 when Walt Disney arrived in California.
 Car 717 is inspired by the 700-750 series trolleys built by the J. G. Brill Company in 1925, and wears a paint scheme similar to Pacific Electric's iconic Art Deco “wings” design.

Unlike the original Pacific Electric trolley cars, which drew their power from an overhead wire, the "Red Car Trolley" cars are battery-operated. The onboard batteries are fully recharged overnight in the car barn, and the battery is periodically "topped off" through non-contact charging using induction coils in the ground where the cars rest at the Sunset Boulevard stop. The trolley poles on the cars and the overhead catenary lines through the park are not energized and were added to enhance authenticity.

Stops

The Red Car Trolley line has four stops throughout Buena Vista Street and Hollywood Land:
 Buena Vista Street at Buena Vista Entry Plaza
 Carthay Circle at the Carthay Circle Theater
 Hollywood Boulevard at Animation Academy (Sunset Boulevard-bound only)
 Sunset Boulevard across from the Hyperion theater

See also

2012 in amusement parks
List of Disney California Adventure attractions
Rail transport in Walt Disney Parks and Resorts

References

External links
 Official site

2012 establishments in California
Amusement rides introduced in 2012
Amusement rides that closed in 2019
Amusement rides introduced in 2020
Buena Vista Street
Disney California Adventure
Heritage railroads in California
Heritage streetcar systems
Hollywood Land
Metre gauge railways in the United States
Narrow gauge railroads in California
Pacific Electric Railway
Rail transport in Walt Disney Parks and Resorts
Railroads of amusement parks in the United States
Streetcars in California
Walt Disney Parks and Resorts attractions